The Society for Medieval German Studies (SMGS, pronounced 'smugs') is an academic organization for scholars working in the fields of medieval German language and literature in the United States and beyond. It was founded in 1985 particularly to provide a platform for German sessions at the annual International Congress on Medieval Studies at Kalamazoo. The society publishes a yearbook entitled New Research in Medieval German Studies.

External link: The society's on-line newsletter

Medieval literature
History organizations based in the United States
Organizations established in 1985
1985 establishments in the United States